Hebrus pusillus is a true bug. The species is found in the Palearctic. It ranges from Europe and North Africa  to Asia Minor, then east to Kirgizia. Hebrus pusillus is a tiny (2 mm long) semi-aquatic bug  which lives in wet places, such as small lakes, heath and fen ponds, often at the shore amongst dense vegetation or in Lemna or Sphagnum. In Denmark, England, Germany and Sweden it is univoltine.

References

External links
Hebrus pusillus images at  Consortium for the Barcode of Life

Taxa named by Carl Fredrik Fallén
Insects described in 1807
Hebroidea